Mucin-1 (MUC-1) is a transmembrane protein of the mucin family encoded in the human by the MUC1 gene. It is cleaved into two chains:  Mucin-1 subunit alpha (MUC1-NT; MUC1-alpha) and Mucin-1 subunit beta (MUC1-beta) Alternative names: MUC1-CT

Mucin-1 is located only in the apical membrane of polarised epithelial cells. It is secreted by endocytosis, after which it is internalised and recycled to the cell membrane.

References

01
Human proteins